Arms and the Man is a comedy by George Bernard Shaw, whose title comes from the opening words of Virgil's Aeneid, in Latin:
Arma virumque cano ("Of arms and the man I sing").

The play was first produced on 21 April 1894 at the Avenue Theatre and published in 1898 as part of Shaw's Plays Pleasant volume, which also included Candida, You Never Can Tell, and The Man of Destiny. Arms and the Man was one of Shaw's first commercial successes. He was called on to stage after the curtain, where he received enthusiastic applause. Amidst the cheers, one audience member booed. Shaw replied, in characteristic fashion, "My dear fellow, I quite agree with you, but what are we two against so many?"

Arms and the Man is a humorous play that shows the futility of war and deals comedically with the hypocrisies of human nature.

Plot summary

The play takes place during the 1885 Serbo-Bulgarian War. Its heroine, Raina Petkoff, is a young Bulgarian woman engaged to Sergius Saranoff, one of the heroes of that war, whom she idolizes. On the night after the Battle of Slivnitza, a Swiss mercenary soldier in the Serbian army, Captain Bluntschli, climbs in through her bedroom balcony window and threatens to shoot Raina if she gives the alarm. When Russian and Bulgarian troops burst in to search the house for him, Raina hides him so that he won't be killed. He asks her to remember that "nine soldiers out of ten are born fools." In a conversation after the soldiers have left, Bluntschli's pragmatic and cynical attitude towards war and soldiering shocks the idealistic Raina, especially after he admits that he uses his ammunition pouches to carry chocolates rather than cartridges for his pistol. When the search dies down, Raina and her mother Catherine sneak Bluntschli out of the house, disguised in one of Raina's father's old coats.

The war ends, and the Bulgarians and Serbians sign a peace treaty. Raina's father (Major Paul Petkoff) and Sergius both return home. Raina begins to find Sergius both foolhardy and tiresome, but she hides it. Sergius also finds Raina's romantic ideals tiresome, and flirts with Raina's insolent servant girl Louka (a soubrette role), who is engaged to Nicola, the Petkoffs' manservant. Bluntschli unexpectedly returns so that he can give back the old coat, but also so that he can see Raina. Raina and Catherine are shocked, especially when Major Petkoff and Sergius reveal that they have met Bluntschli before and invite him to stay for lunch (and to help them figure out how to send the troops home).

Left alone with Bluntschli, Raina realizes that he sees through her romantic posturing, but that he respects her as a woman, as Sergius does not. She reveals that she left a photograph of herself in the pocket of the coat, inscribed "To my chocolate-cream soldier", but Bluntschli says that he didn't find it and that it must still be in the coat pocket. Bluntschli gets a telegram informing him of his father's death: he must now take over the family business, several luxury hotels in Switzerland.

Louka tells Sergius that Raina protected Bluntschli when he burst into her room and that Raina is really in love with him. Sergius challenges Bluntschli to a duel, but Bluntschli avoids fighting and Sergius and Raina break off their engagement, with some relief on both sides. Major Petkoff discovers the photograph in the pocket of his old coat; Raina and Bluntschli try to remove it before he finds it again, but Petkoff is determined to learn the truth and claims that the "chocolate-cream soldier" is Sergius. After Bluntschli reveals the whole story to Major Petkoff, Sergius proposes marriage to Louka (to Major Petkoff and Catherine's horror); Nicola quietly and gallantly lets Sergius have her, and Bluntschli, recognising Nicola's dedication and ability, offers him a job as hotel manager.

While Raina is now unattached, Bluntschli protests that—being 34 and believing she is 17—he is too old for her. On learning that she is actually 23, he immediately proposes marriage and proves his wealth and position by listing his inheritance from the telegram. Raina, realizing the hollowness of her romantic ideals, protests that she would prefer her poor "chocolate-cream soldier" to this wealthy businessman. Bluntschli says that he is still the same person, and the play ends with Raina proclaiming her love for him and Bluntschli, with Swiss precision, both clears up the major's troop movement problems and informs everyone that he will return to be married to Raina exactly two weeks from that day.

Critical reception
George Orwell said that Arms and the Man was written when Shaw was at the height of his powers as a dramatist. "It is probably the wittiest play he ever wrote, the most flawless technically, and in spite of being a very light comedy, the most telling." Orwell says that Arms and the Man wears well—he was writing 50 years later—because its moral—that war is not a wonderful, romantic adventure—still needs to be told. His other plays of the period, equally well written, are about issues no longer controversial. For example, the theme of Mrs. Warren's Profession, which so shocked audiences at the time, was that the causes of prostitution are mainly economic, hardly big news today, and the play Widowers' Houses was an attack on slum landlords, who are now held in such low esteem that the matter is hardly controversial.

Subsequent productions
 The first Broadway production opened on 17 September 1894 at New York City's Herald Square Theatre. Since then there have been six Broadway revivals, two of which are listed below.
 The most prestigious London revival was directed by John Burrell for The Old Vic Company at the New Theatre, which opened on 5 September 1944, starring Ralph Richardson (Bluntschli), Margaret Leighton (Raina Petkoff), Joyce Redman (Louka), and Laurence Olivier (Major Sergius Saranoff). "Olivier thought Sergius a humbug, a buffoon, a blackguard, a coward, 'a bloody awful part' until Tyrone Guthrie said he would never succeed in the role until he learned to love Sergius. Olivier, spurred and moustachioed, was high camp": Robert Tanitch.
 A revival production ran at New York City's Arena Theatre from 19 October 1950 to 21 January 1951, for a total of 108 performances. The cast included Lee Grant as Raina, Francis Lederer as Bluntschli and Sam Wanamaker as Sergius.
 Marlon Brando's final stage appearance was in Arms and the Man in 1953. He gathered friends who were fellow actors into a company for a summer stock production. He chose to play Sergius while William Redfield starred as Bluntschli. The show was produced on the college circuit as well in the 1950s.
 Carroll Baker, following her enormous success in Baby Doll, toured in the play in the summer of 1957. 
 The play was produced in 1982 at the Stratford Shakespeare Festival, with Brian Bedford as Bluntschli and Len Cariou as Sergius.
 The Studio Arena Theater in Buffalo, New York, put on a production of Arms and the Man in 1983 with Kelsey Grammer as Sergius. 
 A Channel 4 television production in 1983 starring Richard Briers as Captain Bluntschli, Peter Egan as Major Sergius Saranoff, Alice Krige as Raina and Anna Nygh as Louka.
 In 1985 John Malkovich directed a revival production at New York City's Circle in the Square Theatre starring Kevin Kline as Bluntschli (later replaced by Malkovich after Kline's departure), Glenne Headly as Raina and Raul Julia as Sergius. The production ran from 30 May to 1 September 1985, for a total of 109 performances.
 The BBC produced a second made-for-TV version in 1989, directed by James Cellan Jones, starring Helena Bonham Carter as Raina, Pip Torrens as Bluntschli, Patrick Ryecart as Sergius and Patsy Kensit as Louka.
 The 1991 production by Channel Theatre Company opened the Malvern Festival before touring the UK. Directed by Philip Dart it featured Sebastian Abineri, Steven Pinner, Juliette Kaplan, Charles Stapley, Mary Woodvine, Andrew Wheaton, Susan Gott and Colin Atkins.
 In 2011 the play was presented by the Guthrie Theater in Minneapolis, Minnesota; The Seattle Public Theater; and the Constellation Theatre Company in Washington, D.C.
 In the summer of 2013, Odyssey Theatre in Ottawa, Ontario, Canada performed a masked performance of this play.
 The Shaw Festival at Niagara-on-the-Lake, Ontario, has performed the play a number of times: in 1967, 1976, 1986, 1994, 2006 and 2014, the last directed by Morris Panych.
 The play opened at the American Shakespeare Center's Blackfriars Playhouse in Staunton, Virginia, on 29 April 2016 and ran until 11 June.

Adaptations

When Shaw gave  the rights to adapt the play into what became the operetta The Chocolate Soldier (1908) with music by Oscar Straus, he provided three conditions: none of Shaw's dialogue nor any of his character's names could be used, the libretto must be advertised as a parody of Shaw's work, and Shaw would accept no monetary compensation. Nonetheless, Shaw's original plot, and with it the central message of the play, remained more or less untouched. Shaw despised the result, calling it "a putrid opéra bouffe in the worst taste of 1860", but grew to regret not accepting payment when, despite his opinion of the work, it became a lucrative international success. 
When Shaw heard, in 1921, that Franz Lehár wanted to set his play Pygmalion to music, he sent word to Vienna that Lehár be instructed that he could not touch Pygmalion without infringing Shaw's copyright and that Shaw had "no intention of allowing the history of The Chocolate Soldier to be repeated." Only after Shaw's death was Pygmalion eventually adapted by Lerner and Loewe as My Fair Lady (1956).
A 1932 British film adaptation was directed by Cecil Lewis. It starred Barry Jones as Bluntschli and Anne Grey as Raina.
A filmed version of Arms and the Man in German entitled Helden (Heroes) starring O. W. Fischer and Liselotte Pulver was runner up for the Academy Award for Best Foreign Language Film in 1958.
An audio version was produced by the BBC in 1975 starring Ralph Richardson as Captain Bluntschli, John Gielgud as Major Sergius Saranoff, Vanessa Redgrave as Raina and Judi Dench as Louka.
A second BBC radio production was produced in 1984 and broadcast on BBC Radio 7 in February 2009 starring Andrew Sachs as Captain Bluntschli, Jackie Smith-Wood as Raina and Gary Bond as Major Saranoff.
A third BBC Radio production was broadcast on BBC Radio 3 on 21 March 2010 starring Rory Kinnear as Captain Bluntschli, Lydia Leonard as Raina and Tom Mison as Major Saranoff. This production was produced by Nicolas Soames and directed by David Timson.
An audio version was produced in 1999 by the CBC starring Simon Bradbury as Captain Bluntschli, Elizabeth Brown as Raina and Andrew Gillies as Major Saranoff.
Another audio version was produced in 2006 by the L.A. Theatre Works starring Jeremy Sisto as Captain Bluntschli, Anne Heche as Raina and Teri Garr as Catherine.
A musical by Udo Jürgens, Helden, Helden, also based on Shaw's play, premiered at the Theater an der Wien, Vienna, Austria in 1973.

Pejorative military use of the term "chocolate soldier"
The chocolate-cream soldier of the play has inspired a pejorative military use of the term.  In Israel, soldiers use the term "chocolate soldier" (Hayal Shel Shokolad, חייל של שוקולד) to describe a soft soldier who is unable to fight well. Similarly, members of the Australian Citizens Military Force were derided by the regular army as "chokos" or chocolate soldiers, the implication being that they were not real soldiers.

References

External links

 
 The script of Arms and the Man at Project Gutenberg
 
 
 Internet Movie Database entry for Arms and the Man
 
 

1894 plays
Fiction set in 1885
Plays by George Bernard Shaw
British plays adapted into films
Serbo-Bulgarian War
Plays set in Bulgaria
Plays set in Serbia
Plays set in the 19th century